Prince Bojidar Karageorgevitch ( / Knez Božidar Karađorđević; 11 January 1862 – 2 April 1908) was a Serbian artist, art writer, world traveller, and member of the Serbian Karađorđević dynasty. He gave singing and drawing lessons and later earned his living as an art critic and translator. He was a contributor to the Encyclopædia Britannica, Le Figaro, La Revue de Paris, Revue des Revues, Magazine of Art, and other publications.

Life
Prince Bojidar belonged to the senior line of the Karađorđević dynasty (his older brother was Prince Alexis Karađorđević). He was the second son of Prince George Karađorđević and his wife Sara Karađorđević (born Sara Anastasijević). His grandfather Prince Aleksa was the eldest son of Karađorđe Petrović, the founder of the House of Karađorđević and leader of the First Serbian Uprising.

Prince Bojidar lived in France for most of his life as the members of the Karađorđević dynasty were in exile after Prince Alexander Karađorđević lost the Serbian throne in 1858. Bojidar traveled a lot and went on a number of trips around the world. He served in the French Army and fought in the French campaign at Tonking and was decorated with the Cross of the Legion of Honour. To earn a living he gave singing and drawing lessons before becoming a translator and journalist. He visited Serbia twice at the turn of the century (1897 and either late 1899 or early 1900), both times semi-incognito, trying to evaluate the general feel in the population about a possible replacement of the Obrenović dynasty with the Karađorđevićs should King Alexander Obrenović die childless, as was expected to happen at the time, due to the King's marriage with Queen Draga of an age beyond childbirth years at the time. He also visited Serbia once after his second cousin once removed King Peter I Karađorđević was enthroned but became disillusioned with the treatment he received (mostly ignored by his regal relative).

During one of his trips abroad, he traveled extensively around India, visiting thirty-eight cities. He wrote a book about his experiences called Enchanted India in which he offered an account of the Indian people, their religious rites, and other ceremonies. He also provided detailed descriptions of the Indian landscape and buildings. He also translated works of Tolstoy and Hungarian dramatist Mór Jókai.

Taking an interest in art, he visited Munich, Dresden, and Berlin and spent some months in Italy; afterward, he settled in Paris. There he regularly contributed articles to the Figaro, La Revue de Paris, the Magazine of Art (Ilya Repin, Jules Bastien-Lepage), including a biography of Marie Bashkirtseff in the Encyclopædia Britannica, 11th Edition, Vol. III. On November 8, 1889, he attended in Rochefort, France, the orientalist feast given by French writer Pierre Loti who has just returned from his diplomatic mission with Sultan Hassan I of Morocco.
In Montmartre, he met and befriended French stage actress Sarah Bernhardt, pioneer of modern dance Loïe Fuller, French poet, novelist and noted orientalist Judith Gautier, Suzanne Meyer-Zundel, Austrian composer Hugo Wolf, painter and illustrator Henri de Toulouse-Lautrec, and founder of the Ballets Russes Sergei Diaghilev. Biographer Stevan K. Pavlowitch claims that the Prince was openly gay and had no relationship with women except purely platonic.

In his later years Prince Karadjordjevitch turned his attention in decoration, and executed panels and medallions for a Paris atelier as a designer, sculptor, painter and silversmith, and often spent time with Georges Lacombe, Émile Bernard, Édouard Vuillard, Paul Sérusier and other members of Les Nabis. Karageorgevitch's paintings, illustrations, watercolors and silversmith works were first exhibited in Belgrade in 1908.

He died at Versailles on 2 April 1908 from typhoid fever

Works

References

External links
 
 William et les garçons (d’Europe centrale) (William and the Boys (of Central Europe)) by Xavier Galmiche, Université Paris Sorbonne et CIRCE 

1862 births
1908 deaths
19th-century Serbian royalty
20th-century Serbian royalty
Bojidar
Recipients of the Legion of Honour
Serbian princes
Serbian journalists
Serbian travel writers
French Army personnel
Travelers
19th-century travel writers
Serbian expatriates in France
Burials at Père Lachaise Cemetery